Moses Najara I (or Najjara, c 1508 – 1581) was a Turkish rabbinical writer, son of Levi Najara, born probably at Safed. He lived at Damascus, where he was rabbi, and died there in 1581. He wrote a work entitled Leḳaḥ Ṭob (לקח טוב, Constantinople, 1571), and was father of the poet Israel Najara.

References

1508 births
1581 deaths
16th-century rabbis from the Ottoman Empire
People from Damascus
16th-century rabbis from the Mamluk Sultanate
Sephardi Jews in the Mamluk Sultanate
Sephardi rabbis in Ottoman Palestine